Ravensbourne may refer to:

Ravensbourne, Queensland, in Australia
Ravensbourne National Park, in Australia
Ravensbourne, London, in the London Borough of Bromley
Ravensbourne railway station, serving the above area
Ravensbourne (UK Parliament constituency), based on the above area
Ravensbourne, New Zealand, a suburb of Dunedin, New Zealand
The Ravensbourne, a north London tributary of the Beam
The Ravensbourne, a south London tributary of the Thames
Ravensbourne (college), a higher education college based in Greenwich, London (formerly Ravensbourne College of Design and Communication)